Egypt women's national goalball team is the women's national team of Egypt.  Goalball is a team sport designed specifically for athletes with a vision impairment.  The team takes part in international goalball competitions.

Paralympic Games

2020 Tokyo 

With the withdrawal of the Algeria women's team by 21 April 2021, the International Paralympic Committee selected Egypt as a replacement at the Tokyo 2020 Paralympic Games.  This was Egypt women's first Paralympic Games participation.  

Round-robin

World championships

1986 Roermond 

The 1986 IBSA World Goalball Championships were held in Roermond, the Netherlands.  The team was one of ten teams participating (Australia, Belgium, Canada, Denmark, Egypt, Finland, Germany, Great Britain, Holland, United States), and they finished tenth overall.

2022 Matosinhos 

The team were eligible to compete in the 2022 World Championships, by placing second in the 2021 regional championships.  

The team competed in the 2022 World Championships from 7 to 16 December 2022, at the Centro de Desportos e Congressos de Matosinhos, Portugal.  There were sixteen men's and sixteen women's teams.  They placed seventh in Pool B, and fourteenth in final standings.

Regional championships 

The team competes in the IBSA Africa goalball region.

2020 Port Said  

The team competed at the 2020 IBSA Goalball African Championships, from 2 and 5 March 2020, at Port Said, Egypt, against Algeria and Morocco.  This regional tournament would have been a regional championships if Ghana and Kenya women's teams had attended as originally indicated.  Of the three women's teams (Algeria, Egypt, Morocco), Egypt was mercied 12:2 by Algeria in the finals to take the silver medal.

2021 Cape Coast  

The team competed at the 2021 IBSA Goalball African Championships, from Monday 6 to Friday 10 December 2021, at the University of Cape Coast Sports Complex, Cape Coast, Ghana.  This championships was a qualifier for the 2022 World Championships.  Of the four women's teams (Algeria, Egypt, Ghana, Kenya), Egypt was mercied by Algeria 10:0, and was awarded the silver medal.

See also 

 Disabled sports 
 Egypt men's national goalball team
 Egypt at the Paralympics

References

Goalball women's
National women's goalball teams
Egypt at the Paralympics
Goalball in Africa